Twin Bridges Airport  is a state-owned public-use airstrip located 22 miles (35 km) northeast of the central business district of Ketchum, a city in Custer County, Idaho, United States.

Facilities and aircraft 
For the 12-month period ending August 17, 2005, the airport had 800 aircraft operations: 75% general aviation and 25% air taxi. The airport is located close to the Big Lost River in a narrow valley. Approaches to runway 21 must be flown off the extended runway centerline due to a mountain.

References

External links 
Twin Bridges Airport at Idaho Transportation Department

Airports in Idaho
Buildings and structures in Custer County, Idaho
Transportation in Custer County, Idaho